Deadline(s) or The Deadline(s) may refer to:

 Time limit, a narrow field of time by which an objective must be accomplished

Arts, entertainment, and media

Comics

 Deadline (DC Comics), a fictional villain
 Deadline (magazine), a British comics magazine
 Deadline (Marvel Comics), a 2002 limited series

Films
 The Dead Line (1920 film), an American silent drama film
 The Dead Line (1926 film), an American silent western film
 The Deadline (film), a 1931 American western directed by Lambert Hillyer
 Deadline (1948 film), an American western starring Sunset Carson
 Deadline (1971 film), a Swedish/Danish film directed by Stellan Olsson
 Deadline (1980 film), a Canadian horror film starring Stephen Young
 Deadline (1982 film), an Australian film starring Barry Newman
 Deadline (1987 film), a war drama film starring Christopher Walken
 Deadline (1988 film), a British television drama film starring John Hurt and Imogen Stubbs
 Deadline (2001 film), a Swedish thriller film
 Deadline (2004 film), a film shot in Pittsburgh
 Deadline (2005 film), a Bengali film directed by Atanu Ghosh
 Deadline (2009 film), an American horror film starring Brittany Murphy
 Deadline (2012 film), an American mystery drama film starring Eric Roberts
 Deadline: Sirf 24 Ghante, a 2006 Bollywood film
 Deadline – U.S.A., also known as Deadline, a 1952 American newspaper drama starring Humphrey Bogart
 Deadlines (film), a 2004 film starring Anne Parillaud

Games
 Deadline (1982 video game), a text adventure
 Deadline (1996 video game), a computer game by Millennium Interactive
 Deadline Games, a defunct Danish video-game developer

Literature
 Deadline (Crutcher novel), a 2007 novel by Chris Crutcher
 Deadline (Grant novel), a 2011 novel by Mira Grant
 "Deadline" (science fiction story), a 1944 story by Cleve Cartmill
 Deadline, a 2000 novel by Campbell Armstrong
 Deadline, a 1988 novel by Tom Stacey
 The Deadline: A Novel About Project Management, a 1997 book by Tom DeMarco

Music

Groups
 Deadline (band), a rock/fusion project by Bill Laswell featuring, among many others, Jonas Hellborg
 The Deadlines, an American rock band
 Deadline, an American punk band that featured future Fugazi member Brendan Canty

Albums 
 Deadline (Leftöver Crack and Citizen Fish album), 2007
 Deadline (S7N album), 2016
 The Deadline (EP), by Supastition, 2004
 Deadlines (Arkells album), 2007
 Deadlines (Strawbs album), 1977

Songs
 "Deadline", by Blue Öyster Cult from Cultösaurus Erectus
 "Deadline", by Krokus from Pain Killer
 "Deadline", by Robert Palmer from Pride

Radio
 Deadline (audio drama), a 2003 audio drama based on the TV series Doctor Who
 The Dead Line (radio drama), a 2009 Torchwood radio drama

Television

Programs
 Deadline (1959 TV series), an American series
 Deadline (1995 TV series), a British fly-on-the-wall documentary series about local newsgathering
 Deadline (2000 TV series), a 2000–2001 American drama series about a newspaper
 Deadline (2007 TV series), a British celebrity reality series
 Deadline (2022 TV series), a British crime mystery mini-series

Episodes
 "Dead Line" (Inside No. 9), a 2018 episode of British anthology series Inside No. 9
 "Deadline" (The Agency)
 "Deadline" (Bat Masterson)
 "Deadline" (Beverly Hills, 90210)
 "Deadline" (The Bill)
 "Deadline" (CSI: Miami)
 "Deadline" (Danger Man)
 "Deadline" (Deadliest Catch)
 "Deadline" (Early Edition)
 "Deadline" (Freddy's Nightmares)
 "Deadline" (NCIS: Los Angeles)
 "Deadline" (Relic Hunter)
 "Deadline" (The Streets of San Francisco)
 "Deadline" (Tales from the Crypt)
 "Deadline" (TekWar)
 "Deadline" (Walker, Texas Ranger)
 "Deadline" (White Collar)
 "The Deadline" (Life on Mars)

Other uses in arts, entertainment, and media

 Deadline Hollywood, an online entertainment news magazine, and its website Deadline.com
 Deadline Music, an imprint of Cleopatra Records

Other uses
 Dead line, Canadian football for the line marking the end of the end zone

See also
 
 Due date (disambiguation)